Ushio & Tora is a Japanese anime television series, based on the manga series of the same name by Kazuhiro Fujita. The series was produced by MAPPA and Studio VOLN. It was directed by Satoshi Nishimura and written by Toshiki Inoue and Kazuhiro Fujita, featuring character designs by Tomoko Mori and music by Eishi Segawa. The anime was split into two parts: the first part (episodes 1–26) aired between July 3 and December 25, 2015, and the second part (episodes 27–39) aired between April 1 and June 24, 2016. It has been licensed for a UK release by Manga Entertainment.


Episode list

Season 1

Season 2

References

Ushio and Tora